Two ships of the United States Coast Guard have been named USCGC Monomoy  for the island off the coast of Cape Cod in Massachusetts.

 , an  patrol cutter commissioned in 1989.

United States Coast Guard ship names